Velen is a town in the district Borken, North Rhine-Westphalia, Germany with about 12,000 citizens. It consists of the two settlements of Velen and Ramsdorf and the four rural regions Ostendorf-Krueckling, Bleking-Holthausen, Nordvelen and Waldvelen. In 2003 the town received the title "staatlich anerkannter Erholungsort" (recreation village approved by the state) from the regional president. Since August 2012 it is a town. It was arwarded the title "annerkannter Luftkurort" (state-approved climatic health resort) in January of 2023.

Personalities 
 Hendrickje Stoffels (1626-1663), partner of the Dutch Baroque painter Rembrandt
 Ludwig Averkamp (1927-2013), Archbishop of Hamburg
 Klaus Balkenhol (born 1939), German dressage rider
 Georg Veit (born 1956), writer
 Marv Terhoch, son of Velen-born Kurt Terhoch, refugee to Canada in 1939

References

Borken (district)